is a Japanese manga series written and illustrated by Yuuhei Kusakabe. It has been serialized in Shogakukan's shōnen manga magazine Weekly Shōnen Sunday since December 2021.

Publication
Shiroyama to Mita-san, written and illustrated by Yuuhei Kusakabe, started in Shogakukan's shōnen manga magazine Weekly Shōnen Sunday on December 8, 2021. Shogakukan has collected its chapters into individual tankōbon volumes. The first volume was released on April 18, 2022. As of February 16, 2023, five volumes have been released.

Volume list

Reception
The series was nominated for the 2022 Next Manga Award in the print manga category and placed 10th out of 50 nominees.

References

External links
 

Romantic comedy anime and manga
Shogakukan manga
Shōnen manga